The Swiss Gymnastics Federation is the governing body of gymnastics in Switzerland. Based in Aarau, it is a member of the Swiss Olympic Association.

Founded in 1985, by merging the Federal Gymnastics Society (founded 1832) and the Swiss Association for Women's Gymnastics (founded 1908), the Swiss Gymnastics Association claims to have 410,000 members. According to its website, it is Switzerland's oldest and largest sports association. Based in Aarau since 1832, it is responsible for the management of competitions (such as artistic gymnastics, rhythmic gymnastics, or trampoline) and also of leisure activities (such as aerobics or sports for youth and seniors).

External links
 

National members of the European Gymnastics
Gymnastics
Gymnastics in Switzerland
Sports organizations established in 1985
1985 establishments in Switzerland